Suhadole is a small settlement southeast of Dole in the Municipality of Litija in central Slovenia. The area is part of the traditional region of Lower Carniola and is now included with the rest of the municipality in the Central Sava Statistical Region.

A number of Iron Age burials have been excavated in the Kovač Hill area. Artifacts from the excavations are kept at the Vienna Museum of Natural History.

References

External links
Suhadole on Geopedia

Populated places in the Municipality of Litija